Senjutsu (loosely translated as "tactics and strategy") is the seventeenth studio album by British heavy metal band Iron Maiden, released on 3 September 2021. Their first album in six years, it was a critical and commercial success, praised for its ambitious epic scope. Two singles, "The Writing on the Wall" and "Stratego", were released to promote the album.

Overview
Senjutsu is the band's first studio album in nearly six years (although having been put on hold for well over two years), following The Book of Souls (2015), marking the longest gap between two Iron Maiden studio albums. This is also their second studio double album, and their first studio album since Powerslave (1984) to have no songwriting contributions from guitarist Dave Murray in any way, as well as the first since Virtual XI (1998) to feature multiple songs written by bassist Steve Harris alone.

The name of the album is rendered on the right side of the cover art by the actual vertical Japanese spelling of "senjutsu" (戦術), and on the left side by a font reminiscent of Japanese characters. Although it is not a concept album, doom is a recurring theme throughout.

The Senjutsu album, released on September 3, 2021, received a positive response from most fans and music critics, eventually reaching the top of the bestseller lists of 27 countries, including Belgium (Wallonia and Flanders), Chile, Brazil, Bolivia, Colombia, Mexico, Bulgaria, Romania, Greece, Austria, Switzerland, Germany, Hungary, Croatia, Malaysia, Serbia, Indonesia, Russia, South Africa, Finland, Italy, Portugal, Spain, Sweden, Thailand, India and South Korea.

In the comparison of sales of physical albums in the UK, the double-disc release took the first position, also noted on the European Album Chart Top 200. The album was ranked second on the world music charts. 17th studio effort also gave the band its highest chart position in the US debuting at number three on Billboard Top 200 Albums Chart and number one on Billboard's Physical Albums Chart. Senjutsu was also in the Top 3 bestsellers in the USA (the highest in the group's history so far), Australia, Ireland, Great Britain (first on the lists in Wales and Scotland), Singapore, Israel, UAE, Japan, the Netherlands, France, Czech Republic, Slovakia, Montenegro, Poland, Estonia, Costa Rica, El Salvador, Nepal, Honduras, Uruguay, Cyprus, Latvia, Bosnia and Herzegovina, Luxembourg, Taiwan, Malta and Ukraine.

In South America and Africa, the album went on sale only one week after the official release date. At the same time as Iron Maiden's album, the latest releases of the most popular representatives of the pop scene and rap, such as Drake, Kanye West, Imagine Dragons and Billie Eilish, were released. In total, the group's seventeenth album reached the top three bestsellers in 55 countries around the world and the Top 5 bestsellers in 63 countries. Senjutsu turned out to be a tremendous achievement, strengthening the group's brand on the global music market.

Artwork
The album Senjutsu marks the second use of the band's original logotype (with the extended letters R, M and N) on a studio album cover since The X Factor (1995), the previous one being for The Book of Souls (2015). The album cover by Mark Wilkinson presents Eddie dressed up as a samurai and holding a katana. An English illustrator told UK's Metal Hammer magazine: "I knew I would have difficulty just plonking Eddie into samurai costume. The higher caste warriors usually had many layers of highly ornate, dense fabric both to project and pad them out on the battlefield – I couldn't see such a costume working for the skeletal figure of Eddie.  Besides, he would look far too flamboyant. I also resisted putting the traditional samurai helmet on his head. It would cover too much detail of the early kabuki-style 'mask' of red warpaint I had sketched out for him. The helmet 'cowl' and 'fukigaeshi' earpieces were like skin and bone attachments. Eddie's head was like a cyborg – part creature, part machine – especially with all the bashed in metal and torn rustic leather of the rest of his costume".

Critical reception 

At Metacritic, which assigns a normalised rating out of 100 to reviews from professional  publications, the album has an average score of 83 based on 15 reviews, indicating "universal acclaim". AllMusic awarded it 4 out of five, stating, "Clocking in at just over 80 minutes, the epic Senjutsu is another distended late-career triumph, albeit one that requires multiple spins to set up camp in your Homeric metal-craving cranium". Wall of Sound scored the album 9/10, calling it an "(...) epic and triumphant return for the lads... better balanced [than The Book of Souls]... with some interesting songwriting". The Guardian awarded it with the highest note and praising Senjutsu as "(...) an ambitious, eccentric master piece". Classic Rock’s journalist Dave Ling awarded Senjutsu with 4.5 stars out of 5 describing band’s effort as "(…) a remarkable album from a band that still has plenty to say and to offer".

As with the band’s former album The Book of Souls, both Kerrang! and Metal Hammer magazines gave the album high marks: the former titled it as "Metal legends Iron Maiden make a stunning surprise return with their 17th studio album, Senjutsu" the latter "Iron Maiden's Senjutsu: an electrifying, cinematic masterpiece" and awarded it with 4.5 out of five stars. Blabbermouth.net were also extremely positive, scoring band's 17th studio album 9/10 and deeming the release in words: "Senjutsu is a modern gem from one of the greatest heavy metal bands ever, if not the absolute greatest".

The American magazine Rolling Stone appreciated Senjutsu and awarded it with 4 out of five stars and highly positive opinion: "Iron Maiden age gracefully, make metal for the ages on ‘Senjutsu’. Long-running metal firebrands have matured their sound on LP 17 without sacrificing any of their epic grit". Rolling Stone went on to name the album one of the top 50 albums of 2021, and the best metal album of 2021, describing the album as "their most progressive masterstroke yet." Ultimate Classic Rock praised album with an enthusiastic review claiming that "Steve Harris seems to have fulfilled his ambition of turning Maiden into a no-holds-barred prog band, albeit with a taste for riffs and melodies that remain specifically theirs. Blue-collar Genesis, if you will, delivered with intricacy and a spirit of unity. After a four-decade career brimming with epic records in this vein, their 17th album, Senjutsu, may be one of Iron Maiden's most epic".

An international online magazine PopMatters scored the album 8/10, advising the listeners to "(...) let the world’s greatest heavy metal band take you on yet another excursion. It’s not without its share of bumps and plenty of familiar scenery, but after more than 40 years, it’s as exhilarating as ever". British magazine NME gave Iron Maiden’s album 4 out of five stars and described Senjutsu as "(…) an instant classic in Iron Maiden’s 41-year journey. The powerhouse metal sound that’s earned them a religious following in every far-flung corner of the globe remains firm. But here, they take things further; ultimately letting imaginations run wild in an album that’s more confident and idea-packed than ever before".

Loudwire called it one of the best metal albums of 2021.

Accolades
The animated video for "The Writing on the Wall" was nominated for the 2021 UK Music Video Awards in the category "Best Animation in a Video". The song was listed among "The 35 Best Metal Songs of 2021" by American online magazine Loudwire, reaching #14. "The Writing on the Wall" reached the 13th position on "Top 40 Rock Songs of 2021" published by Ultimate Classic Rock. Consequence of Sound put the song on "Top Hard Rock and Metal Songs of 2021" list, it's reached the 2nd position. "The Writing on the Wall" made Italian Radio Freccia Top 20 Hits of the Year list to reach the 2nd position. Another Italian portal Inside Music put the composition among the "Top 5 Best Songs of 2021" on the 2nd position. "The Writing on the Wall" was listed among "Best Songs of 2021" by Polish music magazine Teraz Rock, reaching the 2nd position. The song was chosen as "The Song of the Year" by the journalists of Metal Hammer (Greek Edition) and Finnish Tuonela Magazine.

The band and the Senjutsu album were nominated in the categories "Band of the Year", "Album of the Year", "Vocalist of the Year" and "Video of the Year" for the prestigious Czech Žebřík Music Awards. Eventually the double studio album was the "Album of the Year" category winner and animated video for "The Writing on the Wall" achieved the third position, so same as Bruce Dickinson as "Vocalist of the Year". Senjutsu was also nominated in the "International Album of the Year" category for the Spanish Grammy's Premios Odeón Award. Band's seventeenth album was honored with the Top.HR Music Awards by The Croatian Discography Association and the Croatian branch of RTL in the "Bestselling International Album" category. The Top.HR Music Awards has been presented since 2020 and is the local equivalent of the Grammy. Both the band and their latest studio effort were the winners of annual readers' poll announced by German edition of Rock Hard magazine. Senjutsu album was honoured with Polish Antyradio Award in category "Album of the Year – World". The album, "The Writing on the Wall" single and the band were nominated for the Planet Rock Awards (The Rocks 2022) in the categories: "Best Album", "Best Single" and "Best British Band". The British formation's won in the last category, Senjutsu took second place among the best albums, the single reached third place and Iron Maiden were named "The Greatest Metal Band of All Time". In 2022, the band turned out to be the most awarded artist in the history of The Rocks.

"Darkest Hour" was listed among "Best 50 Rock and Metal Songs of 2021" by Audio Ink Radio. The second single called "Stratego" made the "Top 10 Best Guitar Riffs of 2021" list published by Guitar World. "Hell on Earth" was voted the fourth best song of 2021 in Ultimate Guitars' awards poll. The song was ranked as the sixth best song of 2021 by Toru Sugaya of the Japanese website Gekirock. "The Parchment" was listed among "Best Hard Rock Songs of 2021" published by Swedish newspaper Aftonbladet, the album's longest composition reached the 4th position. Promo videos for album’s songs "Stratego" and "The Writing on the Wall" were listed among "Best Music Videos of 2021 (Rock and Alternative)" by Promonews TV.

In the summary of the Japanese magazine Burrn! the Senjutsu album was recognized as the second most important album of 2021, the illustration adorning it was also appreciated (2nd position), the single "The Writing on the Wall" was selected as the fourth best song in 2021. Steve Harris as bassist and composer was recognized as the best musician in these categories and Iron Maiden maintained the title of "Best Foreign Group". Adrian Smith was recognized as the fourth best guitarist in the world. The album was nominated for Fonogram – Magyar Zenei Díj, the Hungarian equivalent of the Grammy, in the category "Best Hard Rock / Metal Album". Senjutsu was awarded with Sklizen Award established by Czech Spark Magazine. Band's seventeenth album was the winner in "Best Album of the Year" category. Iron Maiden were honoured with Metal Storm Annual Awards in three different categories: "Best Heavy/Melodic Metal Album Award", "The Biggest Letdown Award" for Senjutsu album and "Best Video Award" for "The Writing On The Wall" promotional clip.

Track listing

Personnel

Iron Maiden 
Bruce Dickinson – lead vocals
Dave Murray – guitars
Adrian Smith – guitars, backing vocals 
Janick Gers – guitars
Steve Harris – bass, keyboards, backing vocals 
Nicko McBrain – drums

Technical personnel 
Kevin "Caveman" Shirley – production, mixing
Steve Harris – co-production, art direction, design
Denis Caribaux – engineering
Ade Emsley – mastering
Stuart Crouch Creative – art direction, design
Mark "The Tinkerer" Wilkinson, Michael Knowland – illustrations
Ruth Rowland – calligraphy
Moe Iwata – Japanese translations

Charts

Weekly charts

Year-end charts

Certifications

Notes

References

External links 
 

2021 albums
Iron Maiden albums
Albums produced by Kevin Shirley
Parlophone albums
Albums postponed due to the COVID-19 pandemic
Japan in non-Japanese culture